The 1960 local elections were held from 23 to 30 June 1960 for the council seats in all counties, cities and towns of the Republic of Ireland. A total of 2,745 candidates stood for 1,454 seats.

Summary
Elections were uncontested in nine urban councils (the urban district councils of Monaghan, Castleblayney, and Westport, and the town commissioners of Ballybay, Ballyshannon, Belturbet, Boyle, Lismore and Mountmellick) and one local electoral area (LEA) of Monaghan County Council. Elsewhere, voter turnout was 54%, ranging from 29% for Dublin City Council to over 80% in Ballina, Cashel, Clonakilty and Kilkee.

The county boroughs of Cork, Limerick, and Waterford  each formed a single LEA with large numbers of seats and counts: respectively 21 and 63, 17 and 26, and 15 and 34.

A Dáil by-election for Carlow–Kilkenny was held on 23 June, the same day as the local elections in the corresponding areas. The Elections Act 1960 was a technical act to enable the by-election and local elections to use the same administration, giving cost savings estimated at £1,400.

Details

 1960 Cork City Council election

References

Sources

Citations

See also 
Local government in the Republic of Ireland

 
Local elections
Irish local
1960
Irish local elections